Brent Grose (born 11 September 1979) is an Australian former professional rugby league footballer who played in the 2000s. He played for the Sydney Roosters of the National Rugby League. He also previously played for the Cronulla-Sutherland Sharks and the South Sydney Rabbitohs. Grose also had an extended stint in the Super League for English club the Warrington Wolves from 2003 to 2007.

References

External links

Sports TG profile

1979 births
Australian rugby league players
Cronulla-Sutherland Sharks players
South Sydney Rabbitohs players
Warrington Wolves players
Sydney Roosters players
Rugby league wingers
Rugby league centres
Rugby league fullbacks
Living people
Rugby league players from New South Wales